Fox Ridge is an unincorporated community in Greencastle Township, Putnam County, in the U.S. state of Indiana.

Geography

References

Unincorporated communities in Putnam County, Indiana
Unincorporated communities in Indiana